J. J. Isaacson Field at Seymour Smith Park is a 1,000-seat baseball park in Omaha, Nebraska. It was home to the Omaha Mavericks baseball team of the NCAA Division I Summit League. The venue has a capacity of 1,000 spectators.

History
The ballpark was opened in 1961. On October 27, 2016, it was announced that the Omaha Mavericks baseball team would be moving a majority of their home games to Seymour Smith Park.

Ballpark amenities
Press box, electronic scoreboard, field lights.

See also
 Omaha Mavericks baseball

References

External links
 J. J. Isaacson Field at Seymour Smith Park

College baseball venues in the United States
Baseball venues in Nebraska
Omaha Mavericks baseball